Néjib Ghommidh (born 12 March 1953 in Tunis) is a retired Tunisian footballer.

He played for the Tunisia national football team in the 1978 FIFA World Cup. In Tunisia's first ever World Cup finals match, he scored the second goal in a 3–1 win over Mexico. He played as a defensive midfielder.

References

1953 births
Living people
Tunisian footballers
Tunisia international footballers
1978 FIFA World Cup players
1978 African Cup of Nations players
Competitors at the 1975 Mediterranean Games
Mediterranean Games bronze medalists for Tunisia
Association football midfielders
Mediterranean Games medalists in football
20th-century Tunisian people